Balapitiya Grama Niladhari Division is a Grama Niladhari Division of the Balapitiya Divisional Secretariat of Galle District of Southern Province, Sri Lanka. It has Grama Niladhari Division Code 89.

Madu Ganga and Balapitiya are located within, nearby or associated with Balapitiya.

Balapitiya is a surrounded by the Berathuduwa, Brahmanawatta South and Elathota Grama Niladhari Divisions.

Demographics

Ethnicity 

The Balapitiya Grama Niladhari Division has a Sinhalese majority (99.6%). In comparison, the Balapitiya Divisional Secretariat (which contains the Balapitiya Grama Niladhari Division) has a Sinhalese majority (98.1%)

Religion 

The Balapitiya Grama Niladhari Division has a Buddhist majority (99.1%). In comparison, the Balapitiya Divisional Secretariat (which contains the Balapitiya Grama Niladhari Division) has a Buddhist majority (97.9%)

Galle District
Grama Niladhari divisions of Sri Lanka

References